The Tennis Classic of Macon (currently sponsored as the Mercer Tennis Classic) is a tournament for professional female tennis players played on outdoor hardcourts. The event is classified as a $60,000 ITF Women's Circuit tournament and has been held in Macon, Georgia, United States, since 2013.

Past finals

Singles

Doubles

External links
 ITF search
 Official website

ITF Women's World Tennis Tour
Hard court tennis tournaments
Women's tennis tournaments in the United States
Recurring sporting events established in 2013
Tennis tournaments in Georgia (U.S. state)